The 1917–18 season was the 19th season for FC Barcelona.

Results

External links

webdelcule.com
webdelcule.com

References

FC Barcelona seasons
Barcelona